This is a partial list of earthquakes in Mexico. This list considers every notable earthquake felt or with its epicenter within Mexico's current borders and maritime areas.

Geology
Mexico lies within two seismically active earthquake zones. The Baja California peninsula lies near the boundary of the Pacific Plate and the North American Plate, while southern Mexico lies just north of the boundary between the North American Plate and the Cocos and Rivera tectonic plates. Southern Mexico also contains numerous faults, which causes that section of the country to have high tectonic activity. Northeastern Mexico and the Yucatan Peninsula are not as seismically active as the area close to the boundary between the North American and Cocos plates, but destructive earthquakes can still occur in those areas.

Earthquakes

See also
Geography of Mexico

Notes

References

 
Mexico
Earthquakes
Tsunamis in Mexico
Earthquakes